Baille may refer to:
Baille, Marseille, a neighbourhood in Marseille, France
Ludovico Baille
Baillé, a French commune in Brittany